Hârșova (also spelled Hîrșova; ; , Harsovo) is a town located on the right bank of the Danube, in Constanța County, Northern Dobruja, Romania.

The village of Vadu Oii is administered by the town. The village is linked with Giurgeni commune over the Danube via the Giurgeni-Vadu Oii Bridge.

Etymology 
The relationship between the current name of Hârșova and the ancient name of the city, Carsium has long been a matter of debate among historians and linguists. According to Iorgu Iordan the ancient name may have been kept under the influence of the Slavic word Круш, cliff, rock.

The current name may also derive from the ancient Slavic god Hârs (Хърс) and Slavic suffix "-ova" and it is still under debate whether it is in any way linked with the ancient name, or perhaps a common proto-indo-european root related to "ecstasy"/"desire", ultimately also related to the vedic rta and avestan arta.

History 
In ancient times, a Roman settlement named Carsium, belonging to the Scythia Minor province, lay on the current site of the town.

In 1853, The Times of London reported that "Hirsova"

is defended by a fortified castle, and has a garrison of abouit 2,000 men. This place was taken by the Russians in 1809 and 1828. Though small, it is of considerable importance from its position on the very spot where the Berchicha returns to the Danube. . . . It is in many parts inundated, but has good pasturage for the excellent horses which constitute the sole wealth of the Tartars who inhabit it.

Demographics

At the 2011 census, Hârșova had 7,476 Romanians (84.47%), 6  Hungarians (0.07%), 490 Roma  (5.54%), 829 Turks (9.37%), 9 Tatars (0.10%), 27 Lipovans (0.31%), 4 others (0.05%), 9 with undeclared ethnicity (0.10%).

Gallery

See also 
 Carsium (castra)
 Capidava

References

External links 

 Numele Carsium  la Proiectul LTDM al lui Sorin Olteanu (SOLTDM.COM) 

Towns in Romania
Populated places in Constanța County
Localities in Northern Dobruja
Populated places on the Danube
Roman Dacia
Byzantine sites in Romania